In mathematics, the Riesz–Markov–Kakutani representation theorem relates linear functionals on spaces of continuous functions on a locally compact space to measures in measure theory.  The theorem is named for  who introduced it for continuous functions on the unit interval,  who extended the result to some non-compact spaces, and  who extended the result to compact Hausdorff spaces.

There are many closely related variations of the theorem, as the linear functionals can be complex, real, or positive, the space they are defined on may be the unit interval or a compact space or a locally compact space,  the continuous functions may be vanishing at infinity or have compact support, and the measures can be Baire measures or regular Borel measures or Radon measures or signed measures or complex measures.

The representation theorem for positive linear functionals on Cc(X) 

The following theorem represents positive linear functionals on Cc(X), the space of continuous compactly supported complex-valued functions on a locally compact Hausdorff space X. The Borel sets in the following statement refer to the σ-algebra generated by the open sets.

A non-negative countably additive Borel measure μ on a locally compact Hausdorff space X is a Radon measure if and only if

 μ(K) < ∞ for every compact K;
 For every Borel set E,  (outer regularity);

Theorem. Let X be a locally compact Hausdorff space.  For any positive linear functional  on Cc(X), there is a unique Radon measure μ on X such that

One approach to measure theory is to start with a Radon measure, defined as a positive linear functional on Cc(X). This is the way adopted by Bourbaki; it does of course assume that X starts life as a topological space, rather than simply as a set. For locally compact spaces an integration theory is then recovered.

Without the condition of regularity the Borel measure need not be unique. For example, let X be the set of ordinals at most equal to the first uncountable ordinal Ω, with the topology generated by "open intervals". The linear functional taking a continuous function to its value at Ω corresponds to the regular Borel measure with a point mass at Ω. (In particular the singleton {Ω} gets measure 0, contrary to the point mass measure.)

Historical remark
In its original form by F. Riesz  (1909) the theorem states that every continuous linear functional A[f] over the space C([0, 1]) of continuous functions in the interval [0,1] can be represented in the form

where α(x) is a function of bounded variation on the interval [0, 1], and the integral is a Riemann–Stieltjes integral. Since there is a one-to-one correspondence between Borel regular measures in the interval and functions of bounded variation (that assigns to each function of bounded variation the corresponding Lebesgue–Stieltjes measure, and the integral with respect to the Lebesgue–Stieltjes measure agrees with the Riemann–Stieltjes integral for continuous functions), the above stated theorem generalizes the original statement of F. Riesz. (See Gray (1984), for a historical discussion.)

The representation theorem for the continuous dual of C0(X) 

The following theorem, also referred to as the Riesz–Markov theorem, gives a concrete realisation of the topological dual space of C0(X), the set of continuous functions on X which vanish at infinity.  The Borel sets in the statement of the theorem also refers to the σ-algebra generated by the open sets.

If  is a complex-valued countably additive Borel measure, μ is called regular if the non-negative countably additive measure  is regular as defined above.

Theorem.  Let X be a locally compact Hausdorff space.  For any continuous linear functional ψ on C0(X), there is a unique regular countably additive complex Borel measure μ on X such that

The norm of ψ as a linear functional is the total variation of μ, that is

Finally, ψ is positive if and only if the measure μ is non-negative.

One can deduce this statement about linear functionals from the statement about positive linear functionals by first showing that a bounded linear functional can be written as a finite linear combination of positive ones.

References 

 
 
 ; a category theoretic presentation as natural transformation.
 
 
 
 
 
 
 

Theorems in functional analysis
Duality theories
Integral representations
Linear functionals